Carciofi alla giudìa (literally "Jewish-style artichokes") is among the best-known dishes of Roman Jewish cuisine. The recipe is essentially a deep-fried artichoke, and originated in the Jewish community of Rome, giudìo being the Roman dialect term for Jew. It is a speciality of the Roman Ghetto, where it is served by Jewish restaurants in the springtime. In English the dish is usually referred to with the standard Italian spelling Carciofi alla giudea; this spelling may be found in Italian sources as well, but the Roman dialect name is much more commonly used.

Preparation

Artichokes of the Romanesco variety, which are harvested between February and April in the coastal region northwest of Rome between Ladispoli and Civitavecchia, are the best for this dish.

The artichokes are cleaned with a sharp knife, eliminating all the hard leaves with a spiral movement. They are then beaten together to open them. The artichokes are left for some minutes in water with lemon juice (this prevents them from becoming black), then seasoned with salt and pepper and deep fried in olive oil. The last touch consists in sprinkling a little cold water on them to make them crisp. At the end they look like little golden sunflowers and their leaves have a nutty crunchiness. They are eaten warm.

Kashrut

In 2018, the Chief Rabbinate of Israel declared that artichokes are not kosher, since the dense leaves could conceal non-kosher insects. This sowed consternation among Roman Jews, who resisted the declaration, argued that the artichokes used for this signature dish have leaves so tight that insects cannot enter, and emphasized the importance and deep cultural roots of the dish for the Italian Jewish community.

See also 
Jewish cuisine
List of Jewish cuisine dishes
Roman Cuisine
Italian Jews
Carciofi alla romana

References

Sources 

Cervellati, Alessandro (1973). Bologna futurista (in Italian). Bologna: A cura dell'Autore.
David, Elizabeth (1987). Italian Food. London: Barrie & Jenkins . (1st: London: Macdonald, 1954)
Gray, Rose, and Ruth Rogers (1995). The River Cafe Cookbook. London: Ebury Press.

Davidson, Alan (1999). The Oxford Companion to Food. Oxford: University Press.

External links 

 Carciofi alla Giudia
 Italian Recipe Of Jewish-style Artichokes (Carciofi alla Giudia)

Cuisine of Lazio
Jewish cuisine
Jews and Judaism in Rome
Italki Jews topics